Richard Allen (June 10, 1830 – May 16, 1909) was a carpenter, contractor, businessman and, after the Civil War, became a Republican politician in Texas. He was elected to two terms in the Texas House of Representatives. In 1878, he was the first African American in Texas to run for statewide office, but was unsuccessful in his campaign for lieutenant governor.

Early life
Born into slavery in Richmond, Virginia, in 1830, Allen was taken to Texas as a child when his master migrated there in 1837. While still enslaved, Allen gained a reputation as a skilled carpenter.

Career
After emancipation following the American Civil War, Allen went into business as a contractor. He built a mansion for Joseph R. Morris, Mayor of Houston. He also built one of the first bridges across Buffalo Bayou.

Allen first entered public service in 1867, working as an agent for the Freedmen's Bureau, a federal organization created to assist emancipated slaves.

He joined the Republican Party. In 1868, he won a seat to represent Harris and Montgomery counties in the Texas Legislature, serving in the Twelfth Legislature in 1869. He was re-elected to the Thirteenth Texas Legislature, but the election was contested. The increasingly Democratic-dominated legislature seated his Democratic opponent, Gustave Cook, instead. Allen worked to improve public education and to establish state pensions for Civil War veterans. He served on the Texas House Roads and Bridges Committee.

In 1870, Allen entered the race for the United States House of Representatives from his district, but withdrew his candidacy during the early part of the Republican nominating process.

In his business life, that year Allen co-founded the Bayou City Bank in Houston. In 1872 he won a street paving contract with the City of Houston.

In 1878 Allen unsuccessfully ran for lieutenant governor; he was the first African American in Texas to run as a candidate for a statewide office. After leaving the legislature, he continued to be active in the Republican Party. He attended state and national conventions as a delegate until 1896 (for more than two and a half decades).

Allen also served as a quartermaster in the Texas militia. He received a federal appointment as a US customs officer in Houston during a Republican presidential administration.

Personal life
Allen married and had five children. He was a Baptist, and was active in his church and in local community organizations.

Death
Upon his death in 1909, Allen was interred at the Olivewood Cemetery in Houston.

See also
History of the African Americans in Houston

References

Further reading
 Texas Legislators: Past & Present - Richard Allen
 Forever Free: Nineteenth Century African-American Legislators and * Constitutional Convention Delegates of Texas, Texas State Library
 Findagrave - Richard Allen

1830 births
1909 deaths
Republican Party members of the Texas House of Representatives
American freedmen
Politicians from Richmond, Virginia
African-American politicians during the Reconstruction Era
African-American state legislators in Texas
Politicians from Houston
Baptists from Texas
19th-century Baptists